Conor O'Malley (born 1 August 1994) is a former Irish professional footballer who played as a goalkeeper.

Career
O'Malley began his career with his local club Westport United in their youth team. He played for Mervue United's under 19 side for the 2011–12 season, making 2 appearances for the first team in the League of Ireland First Division.
He played for Salthill Devon's under 19's for the 2012–13 season before returning to Mervue's first team, playing 8 games in the 2013 season.

In January 2014 O'Malley joined Shamrock Rovers' B team, he played 15 times for them and also made the bench for the First Team 3 times. As a result, after another year he joined St Patrick's Athletic ahead of the 2015 season. He won the 2015 League of Ireland Cup for the club, by saving 2 penalties against Galway United in the final. He played in the 2016 League of Ireland Cup Final also, as Pat's won 4–1 against Limerick to retain the title. In his 48 games for them he gained a reputation attracting the likes of Leeds United, Peterborough United and Rangers.

On 7 August 2017, O'Malley joined his old Pat's teammate Chris Forrester at League 1 side Peterborough United for an undisclosed fee expected to be in the region of €100,000, and made his debut in a 2-0 victory against Southampton Under-21s in the EFL Trophy. He had a contract option exercised by Peterborough at the end of the 2018–19 season and left the club at the end oh his contract on 30 June 2020 after playing 28 games for the Posh. In April 2020, he had announced that he would be retiring from football upon the conclusion of his contract in order to return home and begin working in the financial sector.

Career statistics

Honours

Club
League of Ireland Cup: (2)
St Patrick's Athletic — 2015, 2016

References

1994 births
Living people
Association footballers from County Mayo
Republic of Ireland association footballers
Association football goalkeepers
Peterborough United F.C. players
English Football League players
St Patrick's Athletic F.C. players
League of Ireland players
Republic of Ireland expatriate association footballers
Expatriate footballers in England
People from Westport, County Mayo
Mervue United A.F.C. players
Salthill Devon F.C. players